Wilfrid René Wood (1 December 1888 – 18 February 1976) was a British engraver and watercolourist. He painted urban landscapes of British towns such as Stamford, Lincolnshire.

Wilfrid Wood was born in Cheadle Hulme, south of Manchester. His mother was an artist and his father a cutler and surgical instrument maker. He was educated at Manchester Grammar School, leaving at 16. He then studied art at Manchester School of Art, and at the Central School of Arts and Crafts and the Slade School of Fine Art in London.

During the First World War he enlisted in the Artists' Rifles and was commissioned in the Machine Gun Corps, serving in France & Flanders and Italy; he continued to sketch during his war service. He lived in Hampstead, London from 1920 to 1937 and in 1926 he created a series of posters for the London Underground. On 3 March 1937 he married Margary Joan Beeby Kingsford (1883 - 1974), known as Joan, at the church of St Martin-in-the-Fields, London; she was a sister of Florence Kingsford Cockerell. They settled in the village of Barnack, near Stamford, in 1937 where he lived until his death.

Wood's contributions to his community are remembered in the Wilfrid Wood Gallery at the Stamford Arts Centre and the Wilfrid Wood Hall (the village hall) at Barnack.

Published works 

By Underground to Kew; Michaelmas Daisy (1926) 
By Underground to Kew; Strelitzia Reginae (1926) 
By Underground to Kew Gardens; Water Lilies (1926) 
By Underground to Kew Gardens; Wistaria (1926) 
Stamford pictorial map
Drawings of Stamford (1956)

References

1888 births
1976 deaths
Military personnel from Cheshire
British watercolourists
British Army personnel of World War I
People from Cheadle Hulme
Artists' Rifles soldiers
Machine Gun Corps officers
Alumni of the Central School of Art and Design
Alumni of the Slade School of Fine Art
Alumni of Manchester Metropolitan University
20th-century British painters
British male painters
People from Barnack
20th-century British male artists